Pholidorhynchodon is an extinct genus of ray-finned fish that lived in the Triassic. Its fossils have been found in Italy, in the Zorzino Limestone Formation in Cene.

Significance
Pholidorhynchodon belongs to a group of fish that are right at the very base of the teleosts. Teleost fish include almost all living fish species, and have their origins in the Triassic. This makes Pholidorhynchodon important because it provides information about the early evolution and development of this important group.

See also

 Prehistoric fish
 List of prehistoric bony fish

References

Pholidophoridae
Prehistoric ray-finned fish genera